This article lists songs about Moscow, which are either set there or named after a location or feature of the city. As some songs are written without lyrics, the following list arrange them not by language, instead, the list is arranged by the song's release country or by the base of its singers, both of which designates the song's targeted audience.

Australia
 "Moscow's In Love" by Rolf Harris

Austria
 "Kissing in the Kremlin" by Falco

Belgium
 "Moskow Diskow" by Telex
 "Moscow Nights" by Helmut Lotti

Canada
 "Moscow Drug Club" by B.B. Gabor from his album B. B. Gabor (1980)

Denmark
 "Moscow Ballerina" by Sir Henry and his Butlers

France
 "Carnaval de Moscou" (instrumental) by Dimitri Dourakine
 "Dizzidence politik" by Indochine
 "Souvenir de Moscou" by Henryk Wieniawski

Germany

 "Auch In Moskau Weint Man Tränen" by Dagmar Koller
 "Melodie Der Nacht (Mitternacht In Moskau)" by Ivan Rebroff
 "Moskau (Moscow)" by Dschinghis Khan
 "Moskau" by Rammstein
 "Wind of Change" by Scorpions
 "Moskau" by Udo Lindenberg
 "Moskauer Nächte" by Hazy Osterwald
 "Rasputin" by Boney M
 "Fly To Moscow" by Modern Trouble

Japan
 "Mezase Moskva" (めざせモスクワ) by 8bit Project (includes Hideki Matsutake)

Italy
 "Moscow (Giardini)" hymn tune by Felice Giardini

Netherlands
 "Moscovite Musquito" by Clan of Xymox
 "Moscow Street Rock" by Olav Basoski

Russia
 "Baburov's Song About Tyoplyi Lane" (from the operetta Moscow, Cheryomushki by Dmitri Shostakovich)
 "Calling Moscow" by Cabaret Voltaire
 "My Moscow", Anthem of the City of Moscow
 "Moscow" a cantata by Tchaikovsky
 "Moscow Morning" by Vadim Zhukov (trance tune)
 "Moscow Nights" (Russian folk-song)
 "Moscow at 3 A.M." by Igor Butman
 "Moscow Nights" 1955 by Vasily Solovyov-Sedoi & Mikhail Matusovsky
 "Moscow-Peking" by Alexandrov Ensemble
 "Podmoskovnye Vechera" or "Nights in Moscow" (Russian traditional)
 "The Best City in the World" - Muslim Magomayev

Operetta
 "Excursion Around Moscow" (from the operetta Moscow, Cheryomushki by Dmitri Shostakovich)
 "I've Come Back To Moscow" (from the operetta Moscow, Cheryomushki by Dmitri Shostakovich)
 "Moscow Nestles On The Skyline" (from the operetta Moscow, Cheryomushki by Dmitri Shostakovich)
 "Song About Cheryomushki" (from the operetta Moscow, Cheryomushki by Dmitri Shostakovich)
 "Well I've lived For Fifty Years On Tyoplyi Lane" (from the operetta Moscow, Cheryomushki by Dmitri Shostakovich)

Spain
 "Moscú" by Georgie Dann

Sweden
 "Red Square" (instrumental) by Triangulus, Björn J:son Lindh
 "Hurra Hurra Vad Det Är Roligt I Moskva" by Michael Dee

United Kingdom
 "Assignment Moscow" by London Studio Group (featuring Basil Kirchin)
 "Back In The USSR" by The Beatles
 "Blue Skies In Red Square" by Demon
 "Crown To Moscow" by Kingdom Come
 "Gorky Park" by Time Of The Mumph (house music)
 "I Speaka Da Lingo" by Black Lace
 "Indians In Moscow" by Indians In Moscow
 "Mary Malone Of Moscow" by Dr. Strangely Strange 
 "Massive Retaliation" by Sigue Sigue Sputnik
 "Moscow" by Future Sound Of London
 "Moscow Underground" by Simple Minds
 "Radio Moscow" by Moloko
 "Radio Free Moscow" by Jethro Tull
 "Roads to Moscow" by Al Stewart
 "Rockit Miss USA" by Sigue Sigue Sputnik

United States of America 
 "All the Way from Moscow" by Jesse Malin
 "An Evening In Moscow" by Louis Alter
 "Bosco Moscow Stomp" by BeauSoleil
 "In Red Square" by The Bomb
 "Stranger in Moscow" - Michael Jackson
 "Too Bad (We Can't Go Back To Moscow)" (from Silk Stockings, 1957 film)
 "Moscow Mulski" by David Morales presents Red Zone
 "Moscow Windows" by Ray Conniff
 "New Home In Moscow" by Henry Mancini
 ”Turbulence” by Warren Zevon
 "Quarter To Three In Moscow" by Skip Battin Combo

Yet to be identified
 "Calling On Moscow" by Propaganda
 "Contact In Red Square" by Blondie
 "The Devil Goes To Moscow (Good To Know You)" by The Hormones
 "Disco In Mosco" by The Vibrators
 "Disco In Moscow" by Able Ram
 "Don't Wanna Go To Moscow" by Electric Eels
 "Fly To Moscow" by Modern Trouble
 "Flying To Moscow" by The Blue Max
 "For What It's Worth" by Oui 3
 "From Washington to Moscow" by Stars For Peace
 "Girl In Moscow" by Nick Plytas
 "Gorky Park" by Chester
 "Hotel Lux" by Tot Taylor And His Orchestra
 "Journey From Moscow" by Russian Jazz Quartet
 "Journey To Moscow" by Perry Botkin Jr.
 "Kiev-Moscow" by NuAngels
 "Last Tango In Moscow" by Angelic Upstarts
 "(From Russia With Love) Little Moscow" by Thomas Lang (singer)
 "Lost In Moscow" by Last Autumn's Dream
 "Love From Moscow" by Alexandrov Karazov
 "Man From Moscow" by The Membranes
 "Maybe To Moscow" by Ferre Grignard
 "Mayday In Moscow" by Fire Hydrant Men
 "Middle of the Nite in Moscow" by With Nikita Krushchev On The Shoe 
 "Midnight In Moscow" by Kenny Ball & His Jazzmen
 "Miniskirts In Moscow" by Bob Crewe Generation
 "Mission To Moscow" by Glenn Miller
 "Disco in Moscow" by the Vibrators (1979–80; a German version was done by Damenwahl)
 "Moon Over Moscow" by Ambros Seelos
 "Moon Over Moscow" by Visage
 "Moscow" by Achim Reichel
 "Moscow" by Boney M
 "Moscow" by Daro & Leeds
 "Moscow" by Geoff Downes & The New Dance Orchestra
 "Moscow" by Gracie Fields
 "Moscow" by Michael Pedicin Jr.
 "Moscow" by N.O.T.A.
 "Moscow" by Orange Juice
 "Moscow" by Shotgun Orchestra
 "Moscow" by The Spotnicks
 "Moscow" by Wonderland
 "Moscow 1980" by Manicured Noise
 "Moscow & Discow" by Taste Of Sugar
 "Moscow Belles" by Hugo Felix and Anne Caldwell
 "Moscow Blues" by Paul Horn
 "Moscow Central" by The Lamplighters 
 "Moscow Cha Cha Cha" by Kay Thompson
 "Moscow Circus" by Jump
 "Moscow Guitars" by The Jokers
 "Moscow Is Calling" by Fancy
 "Moscow Moscow" by Strax  
 "Moscow Motion" by Positive Noise
 "Moscow Mule" by Skeewiff
 "Moscow Never Sleep" by Exbreaker
 "Moscow Nights" by Aliza Kashi
 "Moscow Nights" by Anya (she was also the model on Elton John's 'Nikita' video) 
 "Moscow Nights" by The Feelies
 "Moscow Nights" by Roberto Jacketti & The Scooters
 "Moscow Nights" by Sandra
 "Moscow Paris" by Felix Marc
 "Moscow Rules" by B. A. Robertson
 "Moscow State Circus" by Eugene McGuinness
 "Moscow, the bells are ringing" - Oleg Gazmanov
 "New Moscow Woman" by The Peechees
 "New York To Moscow" by Jimmy James Ross
 "Night Train to Moscow" by Brazzaville
 "Night Train to Moscow" by The Toasters
 "Oh Moscow" by Lindsay Cooper
 "One Night In Moscow" by The AB's
 "One Summer Night In Moscow" by Patty Ryan
 "The Blues In Moscow" by Ram Jam Holder
 "Odeon Red Square" by The Last Man In Europe Corporation
 "Paris-Moscou" by Alexandre Nekrassov
 "Radio Africa" by Latin Quarter
 "Ray Conniff In Moscow" by Ray Conniff
 "The Red Arrow To Moscow" by John McEuen
 "Red Square" by The Cougars
 "Red Square" by Kenny Ball
 "Red Square" by Mama 'O
 "Red Square - Gagarinesk" by Courtney Pine
 "Red Square Dance" by The Defectors
 "Road To Moscow" by The Wake
 "Roads To Moscow" by Al Stewart
 "Rock It To The Kremlin" by The Reducers
 "Rockin' On Red Square" by SS-20
 "Said She Was A Dancer" by Jethro Tull
 "Soirs De Moscou" by Vladimir Trochine
 "Song For A Future Generation" by The B-52's
 "Star" by Erasure
 "Storm The Embassy" by Stray Cats
 "Sunrise In Moscow" by Carl Lertzman And The Hornets 
 "Surfin' U.S.S.R" by Ray Stevens
 "Ticket To Moscow" by White Flag
 "Train To Moscow" by Teddy Vento & Dietrich Pregl
 "Trip To Moscow" by Joe Bee
 "Under Moscow Skies" by Frank Chacksfield
 "Walk Like An Egyptian" by The Bangles

Moscow
Moscow-related lists
Music in Moscow
Russian music-related lists